Mbau is an African surname. Notable people with the surname include:

Elias Mbau (born 1961), Kenyan politician
 Khanyi Mbau (born 1985), South African actress, television host, and artist

See also
Bau (disambiguation)

Surnames of African origin